The Chicago Pizza Pie Factory was a chain of pizza restaurants. The chain originated in Crown Passage (off Pall Mall) as The Chicago Pizza Pie Factory and was started by entrepreneur Bob Payton in 1976-7. The London establishment also had a bar. This was the start of a series of restaurants forming the My Kinda Town chain. The chain opened restaurants in places such as Paris, Barcelona, Buenos Aires, and Tel Aviv, where they operated successfully for several decades.

When Payton sold the company in 1990 the business was pulling in a turnover of £35m.

Payton himself died just a few years later (1994) after being involved in a car accident near Stevenage, north of London.

References

Further reading
  
  
  

Restaurants in London
Pizza chains of the United Kingdom